Asclepias nivea, the Caribbean milkweed, is a species of milkweed. It belongs in the subfamily Asclepiadoideae. It is native to Puerto Rico and the United States Virgin Islands.

External links

nivea
Plants described in 1753
Taxa named by Carl Linnaeus